Grimmia pulvinata, otherwise known as grey-cushioned grimmia or pulvinate dry rock moss, is a bryophyte moss common in temperate climates worldwide.

Characteristics 

Grimmia pulvinata grows in small cushion-like shaped, around 1-2 centimeters tall. Its color ranges from a grey-green to an orange-yellow. Its leaves are lanceolate, being broad and oval shaped at the base and very narrow toward the tip. They may show a silvery hue near the tip in some specimens. Its capsules are oval shaped, and bend back into the leaves when the plant is dry, and stand out when it is moist.

Habitat 

Grimmia pulvinata colonizes a variety of surfaces including rocks, concrete, and tree trunks. It is tolerant of a wide range of PH levels on surfaces, allowing it to live on many types of rock.

However, it prefers surfaces such as old mortar and tree trunks.

Distribution 

Grimmia pulvinata is the most common species in the genus Grimmia, with a nearly worldwide distribution. It is particularly common in Britain and the west coast of North America. It primarily lives in temperate regions, from sea level to elevations up to 9800 feet.

Ecological role 

Grimmia pulvinata is a pioneer species, meaning it is among the first organisms to colonize habitat which has been disturbed by an event such as a forest fire. In addition, its resistance to pollution allows it to colonize urban areas such as roofs, walls, and tarmac.

References 

Grimmiales